Promethium(III) bromide is an inorganic compound, with the chemical formula of PmBr3. It is radioactive salt. It is a crystal of the hexagonal crystal system, with the space group of P63/mc (No. 176).

Preparation 
Promethium(III) bromide can be obtained by reacting hydrogen bromide and promethium(III) oxide:
 Pm2O3 + 6 HBr —500℃→ 2 PmBr3 + 3 H2O

Promethium(III) bromide hydrate cannot be heated to form its anhydrous form. Instead it decomposes in water to form promethium oxybromide:
 PmBr3 + H2O(g) → PmOBr + 2 HBr

References 

Bromides
Promethium compounds
Lanthanide halides